Khewra is the second most populated city of Jhelum District and the neighbor city of Pind Dadan Khan in Jhelum District, Punjab, Pakistan. The city is administratively subdivided into two union councils and is the location of the Khewra Salt Mine. The population of Khewra city is about 35,000 (or 80,000).

Khewra City is also known as "The Kingdom of Salt" because of its rock salt which is 98% pure and natural source of salt in Pakistan. Khewra Salt Mine is the second largest salt mine in the world.

Tourism
Khewra City was established in 1876 with the support of the British Army who occupied on the Land of Khewra before 1947. Janjua Rajputs tribe was the founder of Khewra.

Khewra Salt Mine was discovered in 1872 by the local family of Janjua Rajputs. Since 2002, the main tunnel of the mine has been converted into a tourist attraction. Some websites claim 35000-40000 visitors come here every year. In 2003 a major restoration work was carried out at the mines to make it a tourist destination. Decorative light-work was done and some of the salt crystal found here is translucent, meaning it absorbs some light and reflects some. Depending upon the thickness (among other properties), the salt rock glows when lit in many different shades. The tourist attractions inside the mine include Assembly Hall, Pul-saraat, indoor brine ponds, Badshahi Mosque, Sheesh Mahal, Crystal Valley, Minar-E-Pakistan, Narrow Gauge Electric Railway, Pakistan Post Office, salt crystal formations and old mining machinery.

Wadi-E-Tober is a "Mini Switzerland of Saltians" located on the way of Choa Saidanshah City. The valley is almost entirely populated by the Khewra's community in between high mountains.

Metha Patan Valley is a destination for trekking and hill walking. Metha Patan has a natural waterfall which provides sufficient water to Khewra City. It attracts tourists because of its natural environment. Metha Patan Valley has a potential for mountaineering and rock climbing.

References

External links
 Official website of Khewra

Populated places in Tehsil Pind Dadan Khan
Union councils of Pind Dadan Khan Tehsil
Villages in Pind Dadan Khan Tehsil
Villages in Jhelum District

Villages in Union Council Khewra
Pind Dadan Khan Tehsil